Cam Johnson (born July 11, 1994) is an American professional ice hockey goaltender who is currently playing with the Florida Everblades in the ECHL while under contract to the Charlotte Checkers of the American Hockey League (AHL). He was an All-American for North Dakota.

Playing career
Johnson began attending the University of North Dakota in the fall of 2014 and served as the backup to Zane McIntyre during his freshman year. McIntyre signed professionally after the year, giving Johnson a shot at the starting job. He eventually won the position and backstopped the newly named Fighting Hawks to a first place finish. He was named an All-American for the year but faltered in the conference semifinals. Fortunately, the team's record was good enough to earn the #3 overall seed and UND went on a run through the NCAA Tournament. While the offense averaged 5 goals a game, Johnson didn't allow more than 2 goals in any of the four matches. He helped the program cruise to one of the more dominant postseason performances, winning the 8th national title in team history. He remained with UND for two more seasons, serving as the primary starter. His numbers, however, were not as strong as they had been in the championship year. The Hawks finished 4th in the NCHC both years and only played one more game in the NCAA Tournament.

After graduating, Johnson signed with the New Jersey Devils and was assigned to their minor league affiliate. His performance with Binghamton was less than impressive and he was demoted to the ECHL before his first full season was over. Johnson joined the Florida Everblades for the following season and began to acclimate to the pro game. While he only ended up playing in 7 matches during the COVID season in 2021, he resigned with the Columbus Blue Jackets for the 2021–22 season.

Having claimed the Kelly Cup in the ECHL with the Florida Everblades during the 2021–22 season, Johnson left the Blue Jackets as a free agent in the off-season. On July 20, 2022, Johnson was signed to a one-year AHL contract with the Charlotte Checkers, the affiliate to the Everblades.

Career statistics

Awards and honors

References

External links

1994 births
Living people
Adirondack Thunder players
AHCA Division I men's ice hockey All-Americans
American men's ice hockey goaltenders
Binghamton Devils players
Charlotte Checkers (2010–) players
Cleveland Monsters players
Florida Everblades players
Ice hockey people from Michigan
People from Troy, Michigan
North Dakota Fighting Hawks men's ice hockey players